Francisco José Molinero Calderón (born 26 July 1985) is a Spanish professional footballer who plays for Mar Menor FC as a right-back.

Club career
Molinero was born in Ontígola, Province of Toledo, Castile-La Mancha. After playing two La Liga seasons for Atlético Madrid (his first game being on 25 September 2004, featuring the full 90 minutes in a 1–0 home win against Villarreal CF), in whose youth system he grew, he served a Segunda División loan stint at Málaga CF.

In July 2007, free agent Molinero agreed to a two-year deal to RCD Mallorca. He appeared sparingly throughout the season, moving the following campaign to Levante UD, recently relegated to the second division.

On 21 July 2009, Molinero signed with Romania's FC Dinamo București, leaving Spain for the first time in his career. He spent only one year in Liga I, however, cancelling his three-year contract in the summer and returning to his country, joining division two club SD Huesca.

In the 2011 off-season, Molinero signed with Real Murcia for three years. On 26 June 2014, after never appearing in less than 37 league matches, he moved to Real Betis also in the second tier; he achieved promotion in 2015, contributing one goal to the feat.

On 25 June 2016, Molinero joined Getafe CF on a two-year contract. He returned to the second division in July 2018, with the 33-year-old agreeing to a deal at Sporting de Gijón.

Career statistics

Club

Honours
Betis
Segunda División: 2014–15

References

External links

1985 births
Living people
Sportspeople from the Province of Toledo
Spanish footballers
Footballers from Castilla–La Mancha
Association football defenders
La Liga players
Segunda División players
Segunda División B players
Segunda Federación players
Atlético Madrid B players
Atlético Madrid footballers
Málaga CF players
RCD Mallorca players
Levante UD footballers
SD Huesca footballers
Real Murcia players
Real Betis players
Getafe CF footballers
Sporting de Gijón players
Mar Menor FC players
Liga I players
FC Dinamo București players
Spain youth international footballers
Spain under-21 international footballers
Spanish expatriate footballers
Expatriate footballers in Romania
Spanish expatriate sportspeople in Romania